Ezequiel Alexandre Escobar Luna (born 4 April 1999) is a Uruguayan footballer who plays as a midfielder or  forward for Liverpool (Montevideo).

Career

Escobar started his career with Uruguayan side Liverpool (Montevideo), where he has made 19 league appearances and scored 2 goals.

References

External links

 
 

Uruguayan footballers
Living people
1999 births
Footballers from Montevideo
Uruguayan Primera División players
Liverpool F.C. (Montevideo) players
Association football forwards
Association football midfielders